Yannick Cyril Weber (born 23 September 1988) is a Swiss professional ice hockey defenseman who is currently playing with the ZSC Lions of the National League (NL). He was drafted by the Montreal Canadiens in the third round (73rd overall) of the 2007 NHL Entry Draft.

Playing career

Early career
As a youth, Weber played in the 2002 Quebec International Pee-Wee Hockey Tournament with a team from Central Switzerland.

Weber began his professional hockey career in his native Switzerland, playing for SC Langenthal of the National League B, the second-highest tier of Swiss hockey. However, he moved to Canada in 2006 to develop his game with the Kitchener Rangers of the Ontario Hockey League. In two seasons with the Rangers, Weber scored 96 points and added 26 more in the playoffs. In 2007–08, his last season with the Rangers, he helped the team to their fourth J. Ross Robertson Cup championship and to the final of the Memorial Cup championship.

The Canadiens signed Weber to a three-year entry-level contract in the summer of 2008. He spent the majority of the next two seasons with the Hamilton Bulldogs, the Canadiens' American Hockey League (AHL) affiliate, with his strong play earning him limited action with Montreal and a spot in the 2009 AHL All-Star Game.

Montreal Canadiens
Weber scored his first career NHL goal during the 2009 playoffs, 20 April against Tim Thomas of the Boston Bruins. Weber scored his first NHL regular season goal on 9 February 2011, also against Tim Thomas. Weber contributed two goals during the Canadiens' first round 2011 playoff series against the Boston Bruins, both times beating Tim Thomas. On 9 October 2011, Weber scored a power play goal against the Winnipeg Jets, contributing to a 5–1 Canadiens win in Winnipeg's first regular season game since 1996.

Vancouver Canucks
On 5 July 2013, he signed a one-year deal with the Vancouver Canucks after not being qualified as a restricted free agent by the Canadiens.

In the 2014–15 NHL season, Weber set a career-high record in goals with 11. He scored five of those 11 in the final 11 games of the season, 4 of which were on the powerplay. On 1 July 2015, he re-signed with the Canucks to a one-year deal worth $1.5 million. After struggling in the 2015–16 NHL season, The Canucks waived and subsequently assigned him to the Utica Comets in February 2016. However, due to a season-ending injury to Alexander Edler, he was recalled just a few days later before playing any games for the Comets. He would finish the season with the Canucks but did not appear in many games after this point.

Nashville Predators
On 1 July 2016, Weber left the Canucks after three seasons, signing a one-year contract as a free agent with the Nashville Predators. On 6 June 2017, it was announced that Weber had turned down offers from Geneva and Lugano -that would have paid him more than CHF1.7 million a year over multiple seasons- to pursue his NHL career.

On 13 June 2017, the Predators signed Weber to a one-year contract extension worth $650,000. After appearing in 26 games for the club, the Predators re-signed Weber to a two-year, $1.35 million contract worth $675,000 annually.

On 2 January 2021, Weber signed a professional tryout agreement to attend the Predators' training camp. However, he was released from the agreement on 13 January.

Pittsburgh Penguins
On 27 January 2021, Weber signed a one-year, two-way contract worth $700,000 with the Pittsburgh Penguins.

ZSC Lions
On 8 June 2021, Weber signed a three-year contract with the ZSC Lions of the National League (NL).

International play
Weber is already a mainstay on the Swiss national team. He made his international debut at the 2005 IIHF World U18 Championships in the Czech Republic. He went on to represent his country three times at the World Junior Ice Hockey Championships, captaining the team at the 2008 tournament, where he scored 6 points in as many games. Weber made his senior international debut at the 2009 IIHF World Championship in his home country. Weber was also named to the Swiss roster for the 2010 Winter Olympics. He did not register a point in five games at the tournament.

Career statistics

Regular season and playoffs

International

References

External links
 

1988 births
Genève-Servette HC players
Hamilton Bulldogs (AHL) players
Ice hockey players at the 2010 Winter Olympics
Ice hockey players at the 2014 Winter Olympics
Ice hockey players at the 2022 Winter Olympics
Kitchener Rangers players
Living people
Montreal Canadiens draft picks
Montreal Canadiens players
People from Morges
Nashville Predators players
Olympic ice hockey players of Switzerland
Pittsburgh Penguins players
SC Langenthal players
Swiss ice hockey defencemen
Swiss expatriate sportspeople in Canada
Utica Comets players
Vancouver Canucks players
Sportspeople from the canton of Vaud
ZSC Lions players
Swiss expatriate sportspeople in the United States
Swiss expatriate ice hockey people
Expatriate ice hockey players in the United States
Expatriate ice hockey players in Canada